Plagiotremus is a genus of combtooth blennies found throughout the Pacific and Indian oceans.

Species
There are currently 11 recognized species in this genus:
 Plagiotremus azaleus (D. S. Jordan & Bollman, 1890) (Sabertooth blenny)
 Plagiotremus ewaensis (Brock, 1948) (Ewa blenny)
 Plagiotremus flavus Smith-Vaniz, 1976
 Plagiotremus goslinei (Strasburg, 1956) (Biting blenny)
 Plagiotremus iosodon Smith-Vaniz, 1976
 Plagiotremus laudandus (Whitley, 1961) (Bicolour fangblenny)
 Plagiotremus phenax Smith-Vaniz, 1976 (Imposter fangblenny)
 Plagiotremus rhinorhynchos (Bleeker, 1852) (Bluestriped fangblenny)
 Plagiotremus spilistius T. N. Gill, 1865
 Plagiotremus tapeinosoma (Bleeker, 1857) (Piano fangblenny)
 Plagiotremus townsendi (Regan, 1905) (Townsend's fangblenny)

References

 
Blenniinae
Taxa named by Theodore Gill
Marine fish genera